The Spotlight was a weekly newspaper in the United States, published in Washington, D.C. from September 1975 to July 2001 by the now-defunct antisemitic Liberty Lobby. The Spotlight ran articles and editorials professing a "populist and nationalist" political orientation. Some observers have described the publication as promoting a right-wing, or conservative, politics.

Description
The Spotlight has been described in media reports as promoting an America First position and giving positive coverage to the political campaigns of Pat Buchanan and David Duke.  The Spotlight gave frequent coverage to complementary and alternative medicine, including advertisements for the purported anti-cancer supplement Laetrile.  Kevin J. Flynn's book The Silent Brotherhood described The Spotlight as regularly featuring "articles on such topics as Bible analysis, taxes and fighting the IRS, bankers and how they bleed the middle class, and how the nation is manipulated by the dreaded Trilateral Commission and Council on Foreign Relations", adding "the paper attracted a huge diversity of readers".  NameBase described the newspaper as "anti-elitist, opposed the Gulf War, wanted the JFK assassination reinvestigated, and felt that corruption and conspiracies can be found in high places"

Circulation
Circulation of The Spotlight peaked in 1981 at 315,000 but fell to about 90,000 by 1992.

Critical reaction
The Spotlight was called "the most widely read publication on the fringe right" by the Anti-Defamation League, who also stated the newspaper "reflected Carto's conspiracy theory of history" and called the paper anti-Semitic.

Howard J. Ruff in his 1979 book How to Prosper During the Coming Bad Years praised The Spotlight for its investigative reporting while criticizing it for a "blatantly biased" right-wing point of view and concluded "there are many things I detest about it, but I wouldn't be without it."

U.S. Congressman and John Birch Society leader Larry McDonald criticized The Spotlight in the Congressional Record in 1981 for purported use of the Lyndon LaRouche movement as a source of news items.

Controversies

Lawsuit by E. Howard Hunt
On August 14, 1978, The Spotlight published an article by Victor Marchetti linking former CIA agent and Watergate figure E. Howard Hunt to the assassination of John F. Kennedy. Headlined "CIA to Nail Hunt for Kennedy Killing", the article said: "In the public hearings [of a pending Congressional hearing], the CIA will 'admit' that Hunt was involved in the conspiracy to kill Kennedy." It also claimed that the United States House Select Committee on Assassinations had received an internal CIA memo from 1966 that stated the agency "will have to explain Hunt's presence in Dallas on November 22, 1963".

Stating that he was libeled by the accusations, Hunt sued the Liberty Lobby for $3.5 million in damages in a federal court in Miami in 1981; Marchetti was not named as a defendant. Hunt, represented by attorney Ellis Rubin, said that he suffered a $27,000 drop in income after the article was published. He also said that he was in Washington, D.C., on the day that Kennedy was killed. Miles McGrane, the attorney for Liberty Lobby stated that Liberty Lobby did not believe that Hunt was involved in the assassination, but that he was going to be made a scapegoat by the CIA. On December 17, 1981, the jury found in Hunt's favor and awarded him $650,000 in damages. The decision was later overturned due to an error in jury instructions.

In the second trial, Hunt was represented by Baltimore attorney William Snyder. Hunt testified that he was in Washington, D.C., with his wife and son when he first heard of the assassination. Snyder told the jury that Hunt had already been cleared in the assassination by various commissions and inquiries. Attorney Mark Lane, author of Rush to Judgment and a leading proponent of the theory that the CIA was responsible for the assassination of Kennedy, represented Liberty Lobby. Lane successfully defended Liberty Lobby against the defamation charges, which became the basis for Lane's book Plausible Denial.

Lawsuit by the National Review
In 1985, the National Review and its editor, William F. Buckley Jr., were represented by attorney J. Daniel Mahoney during their $16 million libel suit against The Spotlight.

Timothy McVeigh
After the Oklahoma City bombing it was reported that Timothy McVeigh had taken out a classified advertisement in The Spotlight in August 1993 under the name "T. Tuttle" and had used a telephone card purchased from the newspaper.

End of publication
The Spotlight ceased publication in 2001 after Liberty Lobby was forced into bankruptcy as a result of a lawsuit brought by former associates in the Institute for Historical Review.  Willis Carto and other people involved in The Spotlight then started a new newspaper, the American Free Press, which is very similar in overall tone. An August 2, 2002 court order in the Superior Court of California transferred the assets of Liberty Lobby, including The Spotlight, to the judgment creditor, the Legion for the Survival of Freedom, Inc. who maintains an online archive of Spotlight articles from 1997 to 2001.

Other activities
From 1988 to 2001, the paper sponsored the Radio Free America talk show which was heard on WWCR shortwave and on AM talk radio outlets.

See also
 Alternative media (U.S. political right)
 Anderson v. Liberty Lobby, Inc.
 The Barnes Review
 Ron Paul newsletters

References

External links
Implausible Assertions: Did Mark Lane Convince a Jury that E. Howard Hunt was a Kennedy Assassination Conspirator?
Sample articles from The SPOTLIGHT by Liberty Lobby, 1997 to 2001.

Defunct newspapers published in Washington, D.C.
Defunct weekly newspapers
Newspapers established in 1975
Publications disestablished in 2001
Weekly newspapers published in the United States
Far-right publications in the United States